Tor Sørnes (11 November 1925 – 21 June 2017) was a Norwegian author, politician, engineer and the designer and inventor of the VingCard, the first recodable keycard lock and the magnetic stripe keycard lock.

Biography
Tor Sørnes was born in Sola, Rogaland county, Norway as a son of inventor, radio technician and clockmaker Rasmus Sørnes. Being the son of an inventor, Tor Sørnes occupied himself with technical matters already as a child. In 1950 he was employed a production planner at steel and ironware factory Christiania Staal & Jernvarefabrikk in Moss, Norway. The factory made locks and ice skates under the brand Ving. In 1955 he became the factory's machine constructor and when the factory in 1960—as one of the first in the country—established a department of research and development, he was its director. 

In 1975 he launched the holecard based recodable keycard lock, where each new hotel guest could have his/her own unique key formed by a pattern of 32 holes in a plastic card. The invention is still in worldwide hotel security use under the brand VingCard. The 32 holes in the key gave 4.2 billion combinations, the precise same number as the population of the earth at the time. This lock system was patented in 29 countries. In 1975 Tor Sørnes launched the first recodable cardkey lock, the VingCard, which used a holecard plastic key. He then led the development of and patented the electronic keycard lock, based on the magnetic stripe key.

Export of the system was initiated in 1978 when it was installed in Peachtree Plaza Hotel in Atlanta, Georgia, at the time the world's tallest hotel. The hotel had been troubled by burglaries and was eager to test new security innovations.

In 1992–93 the electronic magnetic stripe card lock was launched and became a worldwide success. Tor Sørnes continued as a vice president and director of R&D at VingCard until retirement in 1992. Following the merger in November 1994 between VingCard's former owners, Abloy Security, and the Swedish Securitas AB, VingCard is now part of Assa Abloy, a Swedish lock manufacturer.

Tor Sørnes is a retired member of Moss city council, and lives in Jeløy. He is the father of author Torgrim Sørnes.

Selected works
2003 – Klokkemakeren Rasmus Sørnes (Borgarsyssel Museum, Sarpsborg Norway)

References

External links
VingCard official website

1925 births
2017 deaths
Locksmiths
Norwegian inventors
People from Sola, Norway
Conservative Party (Norway) politicians

no:Tor Sørnes